KZZV may refer to:

 Zanesville Municipal Airport (ICAO code KZZV)
 KHKU, a radio station (94.3 FM) licensed to serve Hanapepe, Hawaii, United States, which held the call sign KZZV from 2014 to 2018